is a passenger railway station in the town of Minakami, Gunma, Japan, operated by the East Japan Railway Company (JR East).

Lines

Station layout
The station consists of a single side platform and a single island platform connected to the station building by a footbridge; however, one side of the island platform is not in use. The station has a Midori no Madoguchi ticket office.

Platforms

History
Gokan Station opened on 20 November 1926. Upon the privatization of the Japanese National Railways (JNR) on 1 April 1987, it came under the control of JR East. As of April 20, 2018, Gokan Station became an unattended station.

Passenger statistics
In fiscal 2017, the station was used by an average of 785 passengers daily (boarding passengers only).

Surrounding area
Minakami Town Hall
Tsukiyono Post Office

See also
 List of railway stations in Japan

References

External links

 Station information (JR East) 

Railway stations in Gunma Prefecture
Railway stations in Japan opened in 1926
Stations of East Japan Railway Company
Jōetsu Line
Minakami, Gunma